"Lazy Sunday" (sometimes "The Chronic of Narnia rap", "The Chronicles of Narnia rap" or "The Narnia rap") is a single and short film by American comedy troupe The Lonely Island. It was released on December 17, 2005, when it premiered on episode nine, season 31 of Saturday Night Live as the troupe's second Digital Short. Primarily performed by Andy Samberg and fellow cast member Chris Parnell, the song and accompanying music video follow the two comedians as they eat cupcakes from the Magnolia Bakery, buy snacks at a convenience store, and smuggle the food into a Sunday afternoon matinee of The Chronicles of Narnia.

The song was written by Samberg and Parnell, as well as Lonely Island members Akiva Schaffer and Jorma Taccone, in one night. They recorded the following night in the comedy troupe's office and shot the music video around Manhattan two days later using a borrowed camera. After being quickly mixed and edited by Schaffer, the short was approved for broadcast on the next evening's telecast of Saturday Night Live by producer Lorne Michaels.

Although the writers initially worried the studio audience would respond to the short negatively, the short received a positive reception and enjoyed Internet stardom overnight, with multiple bootleg copies surfacing on video-sharing website YouTube, catapulting the awareness of the then-fledgling website. The song and short brought forth positive critical reception, with many hailing it as a revival for the stagnant series. In retrospect, commentators have named "Lazy Sunday" as one of the best Saturday Night Live moments of the 2000s.

Background
The track "Lazy Sunday" and its accompanying music video follow the two cast members (Parnell and Samberg), who adopt the brash personas of hardcore rappers. The song follows their quest to achieve their "ultimate goal" of attending a matinee of the fantasy film The Chronicles of Narnia: The Lion, the Witch and the Wardrobe. The lyrics involve subjects that are "anything but hardcore," such as eating cupcakes from the Magnolia Bakery, searching for travel directions on MapQuest and buying tickets with $10 bills. Samberg described the lyrics as "two guys rapping about very lame, sensitive stuff."

Schaffer and Taccone had been on the writing staff for nearly three months, yet to this point they had only two live sketches that survived the dress rehearsal process and actually made it on air.

Recording and production

Parnell, Samberg, Schaffer, and Taccone wrote "Lazy Sunday" on the evening of December 12, 2005. They recorded the following night in the office The Lonely Island occupied together using a laptop Taccone bought on Craigslist. While colleagues were rehearsing and rewriting that Saturday's show, the group spent the morning of December 15 shooting their video with a borrowed camera. The video used the Upright Citizens Brigade Theater in Chelsea to stand in for a multiplex cinema and Taccone's girlfriend's sister, comic Emily Heller, to play a convenience-store clerk. Schaffer spent the entire next night (into the morning) editing the video and working with technicians to bring it up to broadcast standards. In the moments preceding the show's live performance and broadcast, the team learned from Michaels that "Lazy Sunday" would be shown on that night's show. The three comedians were very worried about how the video would be received by the studio audience.

Release
The short had its premiere on Saturday Night Live (season 31, episode 9) and received positive responses. "It played really well, and we were just super happy about that," said Samberg. The video aired during the actor's first season on the show, when he and the comedy troupe were little known to even Saturday Night Live most devout fans; Samberg reported that the video greatly increased his recognizability "overnight". "It captures a certain scrappiness about the show. There's an unpolished realness to it that I think people can instantly relate to," said Saturday Night Live veteran Amy Poehler. By the following morning, the video was a national cultural sensation. Schaffer and Taccone were contacted by friends who heard the track played on radio stations and in bars and it inspired a line of T-shirts, released during the initial boom of popularity in the weeks after its release. Bill Hader, speaking about the event in 2019 on Conan O'Brien's podcast, recalled Samberg receiving an applause break the following week when appearing in a sketch. Hader recalled, "None of us were angry or jealous but it was more of an envious [feeling], just 'wow, did you see that?' We'd never been that close to a thing that was a phenomenon." The success of "Lazy Sunday" encouraged Michaels to trust the troupe more and push their material onto the show. 
 
The short was initially available after its broadcast through the iTunes Store (then known as the iTunes Music Store), made free for subscribers. Additionally, it was posted to several web sites and shared via e-mail by fans. The unofficial uploads of the video went viral and were cumulatively watched more than five million times on YouTube. The clips were removed in February 2006, when NBC Universal asked the site to remove all copies, along with several other copyrighted NBC video clips. YouTube at that time was a startup website that appeared to be aimed for video creators, but by February 2006, due to "Lazy Sunday", established itself as a home for any type of video sharing.

NBC later placed the short on its SNL site and Hulu. In August 2013 the official SNL channel uploaded "Lazy Sunday" to YouTube.

Reception

Entertainment Weekly put it on its end-of-the-decade "best-of" list, saying, "the hallowed genre of 'white dudes rapping about mundane stuff' reached new heights of hilarity with Andy Samberg and Chris Parnell's 2005 ode to an afternoon viewing of The Chronic—what!—cles of Narnia." Business Insider included it on its list of "videos that changed YouTube forever."

Sequel
On May 19, 2012, Samberg and Parnell collaborated on "Lazy Sunday 2", which starts off similarly to the first one, with more modern references such as Siri, and seeing Sister Act on Broadway instead of Narnia. In the break between verses, the song is dubstep instead of the regular instrumental like in the original. However, in the middle of a song, Samberg and Parnell transform the song into a darker dubstep mafioso rap song. Samberg used Lazy Sunday 2 to bring a close to his time on SNL, with the final lines referring to how the first Lazy Sunday had been the opening chapter of his celebrity, and the sequel was how he would end his SNL tenure. "On these New York streets, I honed my fake rap penmanship. That's how it begins, and that's how I'mma finish it!"

Cultural influence

"Lazy Sunday" is considered to have helped turn around Saturday Night Live declining performance prior to 2005. Thanks to "Lazy Sunday" initial iTunes success, Apple announced they had licensed several archived Saturday Night Live sketches to offer for download in January 2006.

The viral success of the video is widely credited as having been the tipping-point for YouTube's success. The video-hosting site had gone online five months earlier, in July 2005. The rap video was the first television clip to go viral on the site, and in the week of its upload, the website traffic went up 83-percent.

The video also spawned dozens of response videos, including a West Coast response by actor Mark Feuerstein, an English response by comedian Sam Baron, an Australian response about lawn bowls,  a song that defended the honor of the Midwest called "Lazy Muncie," and "Lazy Ramadi," a song by two US Army SSGs based in Ramadi, Iraq. In "The Merger", an episode of the television series The Office, Michael Scott makes an orientation film called "Lazy Scranton" for the Stamford employees who were transferred to Scranton. Starring Michael and Dwight, the video uses the same music, rap style, and camera effects used in the "Lazy Sunday" video.  In the feature film Epic Movie, the character Captain Jack Swallows (a reference to Jack Sparrow from the Pirates of the Caribbean film franchise) breaks out in a rap called "Lazy Pirate Day"; the song is reminiscent of "Lazy Sunday" both visually and musically. Swallows is played by Darrell Hammond, a long-time performer on Saturday Night Live.

See also
 SNL Digital Shorts

References

Citations

General references
 The Lonely Island
 "The Narnia Rap, Deconstructed", Slate.com, December 27, 2005
 "SNL Narnia-Rap Skit: Better Than Actual Rap?", Village Voice, December 20, 2005
 "The Chronicles of Narnia Rap: It Won't Save Saturday Night Live, But It Could Save Hip Hop", Slate.com, December 23, 2005
 , New York Daily News, December 24, 2005
 "Nerds in the Hood, Stars on the Web", The New York Times, December 27, 2005
 , Hollywood Reporter, February 18, 2006
 "A Video Clip Goes Viral, and a TV Network Wants to Control It", The New York Times, February 20, 2006

External links
"Lazy Sunday" on official SNL YouTube channel
"Lazy Sunday 2" on official SNL YouTube channel
 "Lazy Sunday" video on The Lonely Island official site
 SNL Digital Short: "Lazy Sunday" on NBC
"Lazy Sunday" at SNL Transcripts (archived copy)

2005 songs
Comedy songs
Internet memes introduced in 2005
Saturday Night Live sketches
Saturday Night Live in the 2000s
Viral videos
The Lonely Island songs
Comedy rap songs
The Chronicles of Narnia music
2013 YouTube videos
2005 YouTube videos
Universal Republic Records singles